The following censuses were conducted in 1990:

 Fourth National Population Census of the People's Republic of China
 1990 Turkish census
 1990 United States Census